Law of nature or laws of nature may refer to:

Science
Scientific law, statements based on experimental observations that describe some aspect of the world
Natural law, any of a number of doctrines in moral, political, and legal theory

Media
"Laws of Nature" (Agents of S.H.I.E.L.D.), episode of television series Agents of S.H.I.E.L.D.

Other
Law of the jungle, the idea that in nature, the only "law" is to do whatever is needed for survival

See also
Natural law (disambiguation)
Crime against nature (disambiguation)